Martin A. Sandoval (January 12, 1964 – December 5, 2020) was an American Democratic politician and senator for Illinois who admitted guilt to corruption charges in 2020.  He sat in the Illinois Senate from 2003 to 2020.

Early life 
Sandoval was born January 12, 1964, in the Back of the Yards, a neighborhood on Chicago's Southwest Side. He graduated from Archbishop Quigley Preparatory Seminary South High School and went on to Loyola University, Chicago, where he received a bachelor's degree in psychology.

Political career
By 2002 Sandoval was a commissioner of the Metropolitan Water Reclamation District of Greater Chicago; he ran for election to commissioner and to state senator at the same time.

Illinois Senate
Sandoval was elected in 2002 as state senator and was then sworn into office in 2003.

Sandoval questioned the work ethic of Governor Rod Blagojevich during the 2007 budget crisis, as Blagojevich returned to Chicago rather than staying in Springfield for the remainder of the session.

Sandoval was part of the Illinois Senate leadership.  As of 2019, Sandoval was the chair of the Senate Transportation Committee and of the Special Committee on Supplier Diversity; Sub-Chairperson of the Subcommittee on Capital; and a member of the Energy and Public Utilities, Higher Education, and Licensed Activities committees and the Special Committee on Pension Investments.

After a Sandoval fundraiser held on August 16, 2019, at the Klein Creek Golf Club in DuPage County for donors who paid a minimum of $250 to attend. Photos from the event were posted on Facebook the next day showing a mock assassination of President Donald Trump. In the photo, a man wearing the Trump mask appears to grab his chest and lean back as if being shot by a man holding an ersatz assault rifle. Also posted were separate images of Sandoval standing with the man who held the gun in the contentious photo. The pictures sparked outrage online and condemnation from Illinois Governor JB Pritzker; Sandoval released a statement apologizing for the "unacceptable" actions of the guests at his event.

In May 2019, Sandoval introduced legislation that proposed to increase the annual registration fee for electric vehicles from $17.50 to $1,000.00, which would have raised about $2.4 billion in annual funding.

Corruption
On September 24, 2019, Sandoval's offices in the Illinois State Capitol building and his regional office in both Springfield and Cicero were raided by federal agents from the FBI and IRS. The same day two officials were seen exiting Sandoval's house to get hand trucks to take inside. Sandoval at first refused to comment on the situation. Federal agents involved in the raid were seeking a vast array of information involving construction, transportation and power company officials, lobbyists, gambling interests, a red-light camera company, and at least three suburban mayors. Agents also came to both his Cicero office and home. The initial Sandoval raid was quickly followed by federal law enforcement actions in McCook, Lyons, and Summit — all towns in the senator's district.

On November 28, 2019, in the wake of the ongoing probe, Sandoval announced he would resign from the Illinois State Senate effective January 1, 2020 and he had already resigned as chair of the State Senate's Transportation Committee in advance of his complete departure from the legislative body.

On January 28, 2020, Sandoval agreed to plead guilty to federal charges of bribery and filing a false tax return, both of which he had been charged with earlier in the week.  He confirmed that he had taken more than $250,000 in bribes, dating back to at least 2016.

At the heart of the investigation was approximately $70,000 in government-supplied cash Sandoval took from a representative of red-light camera company SafeSpeed, LLC.  This company was working with authorities. Sandoval agreed to act as the company's "protector" in the state senate in exchange for this cash.  SafeSpeed received a portion of the money collected from traffic tickets, and Sandoval began receiving a monthly bribe after complaining that he was not receiving kickbacks on SafeSpeed's ticket revenue.  He also agreed that he had accepted bribery from other people in exchange for using his Senate position, involving at least 5 other participants and with Sandoval directing at least 2 other people.  Sandoval also agreed that he had falsified federal and Illinois tax returns, including claiming 2017 income of $125,905 when his income was at least $259,255, and also underreporting his income for 2012 through 2016.

As part of his plea agreement, Sandoval agreed to cooperate with federal investigations.  At his plea hearing, he was released on $10,000 bond and banned from leaving the state, and was scheduled for sentencing in July.

Personal life and death
Sandoval and his wife Marina had three children. He died from COVID-19 at Loyola University Medical Center on December 5, 2020, aged 56, during the COVID-19 pandemic in Illinois.

References

External links
Senator Martin A. Sandoval (D) at the Illinois General Assembly
By session: 98th, 97th, 96th
Illinois State Senator Martin Sandoval constituency site
 
Senator Martin Sandoval at Illinois Senate Democrats

1964 births
21st-century American politicians
American people convicted of tax crimes
Politicians convicted of program bribery
Hispanic and Latino American state legislators in Illinois
Democratic Party Illinois state senators
Loyola University Chicago alumni
Illinois politicians convicted of crimes
Politicians from Chicago
2020 deaths
Deaths from the COVID-19 pandemic in Illinois